Mocha may refer to:

Places

 Mocha, Yemen, a city in Yemen
 Mocha Island, an island in Biobío Region, Chile
 Mocha, Chile, a town in Chile
 Mocha, Ecuador, a city in Ecuador
 Mocha Canton, a government subdivision in Ecuador
 Mocha, a segment of Kutiyana (Vidhan Sabha constituency), Gujarat, India
 Mocha, a village in Madhya Pradesh, India

People
 Mocha Uson or Mocha (born 1982), stage name of Philippine performer and blogger Margaux Justiniano Uson
 Nickname of Maurie Dunstan (1929–1991), Australian rules footballer
 Nickname of Aída García Naranjo (born 1951), Peruvian educator, singer, and politician

Software
 Mocha (decompiler), for the Java language
 Mocha (JavaScript framework), for writing unit tests
 Mocha, the working title of the programming language later named JavaScript  
 Mocha-brand image-processing software products from Imagineer Systems

Other uses
 Caffè mocha, a beverage that incorporates coffee, chocolate and milk
 Mocha, a coffee-and-chocolate flavor of ice cream
 Mocha coffee bean, a cultivated variety
 Wey Mocha, a mid-size luxury crossover SUV
 A moth of the genus Cyclophora
 A moth of the European species Cyclophora annularia
 Mocha or Shekkacho language, a language of Ethiopia

See also
 MOCA (disambiguation)
 MOCCA (disambiguation)
 Moka (disambiguation)
 Rapid Climate Change-Meridional Overturning Circulation and Heatflux Array (RAPID/MOCHA), a research project